Ricardo Colbachini (born 23 March 1985) is a Brazilian football manager.

Career
Colbachini was born in Caxias do Sul, Rio Grande do Sul, and quit his playing career at the age of 17 after "not seeing himself as a distinct player". He then started his coaching career at Juventude, club he was representing as a player, as a manager of the under-13s.

Colbachini was subsequently in charge of Grêmio and Internacional's under-15 sides before being appointed Lisca's assistant at Caxias in 2011.

In April 2011, after Lisca's successor Luiz Carlos Ferreira was sacked, Colbachini was appointed interim manager. At the age of just 26, he became the youngest manager of the Copa do Brasil when his side defeated Botafogo-PB.

On 3 January 2013, Colbachini returned to Juventude, again being named Lisca's assistant. On 25 October, he moved back to Inter and was appointed in charge of the under-17 squad.

In May 2015, Colbachini took over Internacional's B-team, replacing fired Clemer. On 10 October 2019, after the dismissal of Odair Hellmann, he was appointed interim manager of the first team; his first professional match occurred three days later, a 0–0 home draw against Santos for the Série A championship.

On 20 October 2019, after the appointment of Zé Ricardo as first team manager, Colbachini returned to his previous role with the reserve team. On 24 April of the following year, he was named Pelotas manager.

References

External links

1985 births
Living people
People from Caxias do Sul
Brazilian football managers
Campeonato Brasileiro Série A managers
Campeonato Brasileiro Série D managers
Sociedade Esportiva e Recreativa Caxias do Sul managers
Sport Club Internacional managers
Esporte Clube Pelotas managers
Sociedade Esportiva do Gama managers
Brazilian expatriate football managers
Brazilian expatriate sportspeople in Switzerland
Sportspeople from Rio Grande do Sul